BBC News Pidgin is an online news service in West African Pidgin English that was launched by the BBC World Service in 2017. It is based in Lagos, Nigeria.

Pidgin, first used by British and African slavers to facilitate the Atlantic slave trade in the late 17th century, has become one of the most widely spoken languages in West Africa, with up to 75 million speakers in Nigeria alone. However, it does not have a standard written form.

References

External links
  (in West African Pidgin English)

BBC News channels